Saint Raymond's Cemetery is a Roman Catholic cemetery at 2600 Lafayette Avenue in the Throggs Neck and Schuylerville sections of the Bronx, New York City, United States. The cemetery is composed of two separate locations: the older section (main entrance is located at 1201 Balcom Avenue), and the newer section (where most present-day burials now take place), both east of the Hutchinson River Parkway. The Bronx–Whitestone Bridge is located adjacent to the cemetery's newer section, while the neighboring Throgs Neck Bridge can be seen from a distance.

The cemetery is owned and operated by the Archdiocese of New York. It is the only Catholic cemetery in the Bronx and is one of the busiest cemeteries in the United States with nearly 2,500 burials each year. The cemetery provides in-ground burials, in-ground crypt burials in the new Holy Cross section, Mausoleum burials and niches for cremains and burials in the base of the gigantic granite Cross located in the Holy Cross section. There is also a special Garden of Innocents where still-born and  young babies are laid to rest. A portion of the St. Peters section was set aside in 1964 for the burial of the Archdiocese's clergymen.

History
The cemetery land was originally the "Underhill Farm of Throgg's Neck." It was purchased and consecrated by the forward-thinking Rev. Michael B. McEvoy, pastor from 1875 to 1885 of St. Raymond's Church, who bought the land and utilized it for burial purposes as Saint Raymond's Cemetery. Through its connection to St. Raymond's Church, the cemetery was dedicated in honor of Saint Raymond Nonnatus, a 13th-century saint.

Lindbergh case

Shortly after his son's kidnapping in 1932, aviator Charles Lindbergh and Bronx resident John Condon met with the alleged kidnapper at St. Raymond's to deliver $50,000 in ransom money. Despite the payment, the child's body was found a few months later. Bruno Richard Hauptmann was convicted of the murder in 1935 and executed the following year.

Notable burials

 Mary Mallon (also known as "Typhoid Mary"), notable asymptomatic carrier (18691938)
 Francis P. Duffy, Canadian-American soldier and chaplain (1871–1932)
 Anthony de Francisci, sculptor (1887–1964)
 Private William Joseph Bray, Veterans Guard of Canada service member killed during World War II; one of three gravesites of British Commonwealth servicemen at St. Raymond's Cemetery administered by the Commonwealth War Graves Commission.
 James Austin Byrnes, Royal Air Force cadet killed during World War I; one of three gravesites of British Commonwealth servicemen at St. Raymond's Cemetery administered by the Commonwealth War Graves Commission.
 Anjelica Castillo, notable murder victim known in the press as "Baby Hope"
 Lesandro "Junior" Guzman-Feliz, notable gang violence victim (20022018)
 James Kerrigan, Civil War Union Army officer; U.S. Congressman (1828–1899)
 George William Loft, businessman & politician (1865–1943)
 Charles C. Marrin, New York State Assemblyman and Municipal Court Justice (1868–1950)
 John E. McGeehan, former New York State Supreme Court judge (1880–1968)
 Arthur H. Murphy  first Democratic County Chairman in the Bronx (1868–1922)
 John J. Nolan, Civil War Medal of Honor recipient (1842–1912)
 Christopher Nugent, Civil War Medal of Honor recipient (1838–1898)
 John P. Nugent, New York State Assemblyman and New York City Councilman (1879–1944)
 Duncan T. O'Brien, politician (1895–1938)
 Thomas H. O'Shea, Irish revolutionary and US labor organizer (1898–1962)
 Joseph Maria Pernicone, first Italian-born bishop in the Archdiocese of New York (1903–1985)
 Frank G. Rossetti, former New York State Senator (1908–1992)
 Cristina Santiago (19812011), LGBT activist; one of seven victims killed during the August 2011 Indiana State Fair stage collapse
 Godfrey E. Santini, one of the Seven Santini Brothers (1889–1956)
 William F. Smith, member of the New York State Assembly (1901–1950)
 Valentina Suriani, notable murder victim (1958–1977)
 Patsy Touhey, celebrated uilleann piper (1865–1923)
 Henry Paul Michael Zary, Royal Canadian Air Force Squadron Leader killed during World War II; one of three gravesites of British Commonwealth servicemen at St. Raymond's Cemetery administered by the Commonwealth War Graves Commission.

Entertainment
 Henry "Red" Allen, jazz trumpeter (1906–1967)
 Kyrle Bellew, British stage-actor (1850–1911)
 Michael Coleman, Irish fiddle player (1891–1945)
 Billie Holiday, jazz singer (1915–1959)
 Jackie Landry Jackson, member of girl group The Chantels (1941–1997)
 La Lupe, salsa music singer (1936–1992)
 Héctor Lavoe, salsa music musician (1946–1993)
 Lillian Lorraine, vaudeville entertainer (1895–1955)
 Frankie Lymon, singer (1942–1968)
 James Morrison, Irish-American fiddler and band leader (1891–1947)
 Lois Nettleton, actress (1927–2008)
 Steve Vibert Pouchie, Latin Jazz, maestro (1954–2015)
 Hilton Ruiz, musician/composer (1952–2006)
 Merlin Santana, actor (1976–2002)
 Dave Valentin, American Latin jazz flautist

Sports
 Hector "Macho" Camacho, Puerto Rican professional boxer, three division world champion (1962–2012)
 Benny "Kid" Paret, Cuban professional boxer, two times world Welterweight champion (1937–1962)

Organized crime members
 Joseph "The Baker" Catania, mobster (1902–1931)
 Peter Coll, Gangster, rumrunner and brother of Vincent "Mad Dog" Coll.
 Vincent "Mad Dog" Coll, mobster (1908–1932)
 Anthony Salerno, mobster (1911–1992)

Notes

References

External links
 Official website
 Old St. Raymond's Cemetery at Find A Grave
 New St. Raymond's Cemetery at Find A Grave

Roman Catholic Archdiocese of New York
Cemeteries in the Bronx
Throggs Neck, Bronx
Roman Catholic cemeteries in New York (state)